Brandon Michael Gorin (born July 17, 1978) is a former American football offensive tackle. He was drafted by the San Diego Chargers in the seventh round of the 2001 NFL Draft. He played college football at Purdue.

Gorin has also played for the New England Patriots, Arizona Cardinals, St. Louis Rams and Denver Broncos. He earned two Super Bowl rings with the Patriots.  Post-football, he appeared in a 2017 episode of HGTV's House Hunters (Season 136, Episode 5), along with his then fiance', Stephanie.

Early years
Gorin attended school at St. Lawrence Catholic School. Gorin earned first-team all-state honors as a defensive tackle at Muncie Southside High School in Muncie, Indiana, where he was coached by Mike Paul. He played on the school's nationally ranked basketball team, competed in track and field as discus thrower, and earned academic all-state honors.  Gorin was named Muncie-Delaware County's 1996 Scholar Athlete of the Year and ranked second in his high school graduating class with 3.8 GPA.  He coached a youth basketball league team in Muncie and would like to pursue a career as a college basketball coach when his playing days are over.

College years
Gorin was a three-year starter at right tackle for the Purdue University Boilermakers, starting on same offensive line as New England Patriots left tackle Matt Light. Patriots linebacker Rosevelt Colvin was also a teammate in 1998.  He was shifted to offensive tackle after beginning career on defensive line.  Gorin helped the Boilermakers' offense average over 450 yards in his 39 career starts.  He started every game at right tackle as a senior as the offensive line surrendered just seven sacks on 473 pass attempts.  He earned All-Big Ten Conference Academic honors as a sophomore and earned a degree in industrial engineering.

Professional career

San Diego Chargers
After being drafted by the San Diego Chargers in the seventh round (201st overall) in the 2001 NFL Draft, Gorin played for San Diego for two years. During his time as a Charger, he did not play a single snap.

New England Patriots
On September 5, 2002, he was signed as a free agent by the New England Patriots.  He saw limited action in 2003, but became a starter in 2004 after an injury to Tom Ashworth.

Arizona Cardinals
He was traded to the Arizona Cardinals in August 2006 for a conditional 2007 draft pick (sixth-round draft pick), was released a year later by the Cardinals.

St. Louis Rams
He was signed as a free agent by the St. Louis Rams. On March 7, 2008, Gorin was re-signed as an unrestricted free agent for a one-year contract.

Denver Broncos
Gorin was signed as an unrestricted free agent by the Denver Broncos on April 17, 2009. The move reunited him with Broncos head coach Josh McDaniels, who served as quarterbacks coach for the Patriots during most of Gorin's time in New England.

References

External links
Denver Broncos bio
New England Patriots bio
Rams Player Bio

1978 births
Living people
Sportspeople from Muncie, Indiana
Players of American football from Indiana
American football offensive tackles
Purdue Boilermakers football players
San Diego Chargers players
New England Patriots players
Arizona Cardinals players
St. Louis Rams players
Denver Broncos players